Events from the year 1877 in France.

Incumbents
President: Patrice de MacMahon, Duke of Magenta 
President of the Council of Ministers: 
 until 17 May: Jules Simon
 17 May-23 November: Albert, 4th duc de Broglie
 23 November-13 December: Gaëtan de Rochebouët 
 starting 13 December: Jules Armand Dufaure

Events
 16 May – Constitutional crisis which ultimately seals the defeat of the royalist movement.
 14 October – Legislative election held.
 28 October – Legislative election held.

Births

January to March
 29 January – Georges Catroux, military officer and diplomat (died 1969)
 17 February – André Maginot, politician, advocate of the Maginot Line (died 1932)
 19 February – Louis Aubert, composer (died 1968)
 21 February – Reginald Garrigou-Lagrange, Catholic theologian (died 1964)
 28 February – André Simon, wine merchant, gourmet and writer (died 1970)
 21 March – Maurice Farman, motor racing driver, aviator, aircraft manufacturer and designer (died 1964)
 29 March – Jules Boucherit, violinist and teacher (died 1962)

April to June
 15 April – Jules Basdevant, law professor (died 1968)
 26 May – Jean Schlumberger, writer and journalist (died 1968)
 31 May – Gabrielle Renaudot Flammarion, née Renaudot, astronomer (died 1962)
 14 June – Jane Bathori, opera singer (died 1970)

July to December
 4 July – Jacques Bacot, explorer and Tibetologist (died 1965)
 5 July – Georges Saillard, actor (died 1967)
 6 July – Arnaud Massy, golfer (died 1950)
 8 July – René Navarre, actor (died 1968)
 19 July – Cécile Brunschvicg, politician (died 1946)
 18 November – Jules Isaac, historian (died 1963)
 13 December – Edmond Locard, pioneer in forensic science (died 1966)

Deaths
 31 March – Antoine Augustin Cournot, economist, philosopher and mathematician (born 1801)
 26 April - Louise Bertin, composer (born 1805)
 28 June – Jacques-Maurice De Saint Palais, Archbishop of Indianapolis (born 1811)
 3 September – Adolphe Thiers, politician, historian and Prime Minister of France (born 1797)
 23 September – Urbain Le Verrier, mathematician (born 1811)
 16 October – Théodore Barrière, dramatist (born 1823)
 26 December
 Aristide Boucicaut, creator of Le Bon Marché department stores (born 1810)
 Jean-Jacques Meyer, steam locomotive engineer (born 1805)
 31 December – Gustave Courbet, painter (born 1819)

References

1870s in France